, formerly a city in Tochigi Prefecture, Japan, is a district located in the modern city of Nasushiobara. The former city was founded on November 1, 1970.

In 2003, the city had an estimated population of 60,145 and a density of 175.29 persons per km². The total area was 343.12 km².

History
On January 1, 2005, Kuroiso was merged with the towns of Nishinasuno and Shiobara (both from Nasu District) to create the city of Nasushiobara.

Geography
Kuroiso is located at the northernmost tip of Tochigi, bordering Fukushima Prefecture. Kuroiso Station serves as the terminal station for two subsections of the JR East Tōhoku Main Line railway, making it a junction between the Kantō and Tōhoku regions of Japan. The station's bus terminal also makes Kuroiso a gateway to the neighboring town of Nasu, known in Japan for its mountain hot springs and as the location of the Nasu Imperial Villa.

Main sights
Kuroiso is popular in Northern Tochigi for its local cafes and restaurants, as well as for having northern Tochigi's only multiplex movie theater.

A Bridgestone steel cord plant is also located in the district.

References

External links
 Nasushiobara official website 

Dissolved municipalities of Tochigi Prefecture